Breaker! Breaker! is a 1977 American action film directed by Don Hulette and starring Chuck Norris.

Plot
J.D. (Chuck Norris), a trucker from California, returns from the road to learn that an old friend was assaulted and paralyzed by Sergeant Strode (Don Gentry), a policeman in Texas City, California. He makes inquiries into Texas City and learns that its policemen Strode and Deputy Boles (Ron Cedillos) have a history of "trapping" truckers for a corrupt judge named Trimmings who is running various rackets in the so-called "City".

When his younger brother Billy (Michael Augenstein) begins working as a trucker, J.D. warns him to stay away from Texas City. But Billy is easily fooled by an officer (Strode) on a CB radio, who pretends he is a fellow trucker.

After Billy disappears, J.D. sets out in search of him. He goes to Texas City and barges in on a city council meeting, wherein Trimmings' stooges boast of their speed traps. He befriends a waitress named Arlene, a single mother, working at a diner which overcharges outsiders. After getting into a fight with the owner of the local wrecking yard and accidentally killing him, J.D. is arrested and sentenced to death by Judge Trimmings.

Arlene escapes from Trimmings corrupt lawmen on a motorcycle and contacts J.D.'s fellow truckers about what has happened via CB radio. They come to rescue J.D. and Billy, knocking Strode into a ditch before tearing the town down with their big rigs. J.D. finds Billy in a local barn, and then fights Deputy Boles in a horse corral, knocking him out. One of the truckers drives his rig into Judge Trimmings house while he is in bed with his lover, presumably killing them, as the rest of the corrupt town burns.

Cast

 Chuck Norris as John David "J.D." Dawes 
 George Murdock as Judge Joshua Trimmings
 Terry O'Connor as Arlene Trimmings
 Don Gentry as Sergeant Strode
 John DiFusco as Arney
 Ron Cedillos as Deputy Boles
 Michael Augenstein as Billy Dawes
 Dan Vandegrift as Wilfred
 Douglas Stevenson as Drake
 Paul Kawecki as Wade 
 Larry Feder as George
 Jack Nance as Burton

Production
Norris said he was paid $5,000 to do the film. "I didn't know anything when I made that movie", said Norris. "We shot it in just 11 days. But it was amazing, people loved it anyway. It's a down-home kind of movie. It's still my dad's favorite."

"I want to become as big in the movie industry as I've been in the karate industry", said Norris in 1977. "I know I can do it because I have the faith to do it."

Reception

Critical response
Norris was not particularly proud of the film but in 1981 said it was his father's favorite of his movies and "made a lot of money".

The New York Times called it "shoddy" with "wooden direction" and a "sophmoric cast". The Los Angeles Times called it "a talky, melodramatic exploitation hybrid."

Other media

In popular culture

The film was referenced on the May 24, 2007 episode of Late Night with Conan O'Brien, when O'Brien used a Breaker! Breaker! lever to showcase random scenes from Walker, Texas Ranger.

The film was a subject of good-natured ridicule in a March 21, 2013 video-on-demand release by Rifftrax.

See also
 Chuck Norris filmography

References

1977 films
1977 action films
1970s road movies
American chase films
American road movies
American International Pictures films
Films set in California
Trucker films
1970s English-language films
1970s American films